The state newsagency Moldpres is a non-budgetary, self-financing organization, founded by the government of the Republic of Moldova.

Overview 

According to its official website, Moldpress has three main activities: disseminating news stories, photo chronicles, and issuing the Monitorul Oficial, the official publication of Moldovan laws. It is located in Chişinău, Moldova on 22, Puskin str.

The institution has just over 100 employees, and owns a press centre with a conference hall. Since July 2004, the agency has seven departments: News, the Monitorul Oficial, Finance, Marketing, Technology and Photo Services, Polygraphy, and Management.

In November 2009, Vladimir Darie remplaced Valeriu Reniţă as director of Moldpres.

External link 
 Moldpress website in Romanian, English, and Russian.

Organizations established in 1940
News agencies based in Moldova
Moldovan news websites